The 2015–16 Winnipeg Jets season was the 17th season for the National Hockey League franchise that was established on June 25, 1997, and the fifth in Winnipeg, since the franchise relocated from Atlanta prior to the start of the 2011–12 NHL season.

Schedule and results

Pre-season

Regular season

Player statistics
Final stats

Skaters

Goaltenders

†Denotes player spent time with another team before joining the Jets.  Stats reflect time with the Jets only.
‡Traded mid-season. Stats reflect time with the Jets only.
Bold/italics denotes franchise record

Suspensions/fines

Awards and honours

Awards

Milestones

Transactions
Winnipeg has been involved in the following transactions during the 2015–16 season.

Trades

Winnipeg to retain 36% ($1.584 million) of salary as part of trade.

Free agents acquired

Free agents lost

Claimed via waivers

Lost via waivers

Lost via retirement

Player signings

Draft picks

Below are the Winnipeg Jets' selections at the 2015 NHL Entry Draft, to be held on June 26–27, 2015 at the BB&T Center in Sunrise, Florida.

Draft notes

 The Sabres' first-round pick went to the Winnipeg Jets as the result of a trade on February 11, 2015 that sent Evander Kane, Zach Bogosian and Jason Kasdorf to Buffalo in exchange for Tyler Myers, Drew Stafford, Joel Armia, Brendan Lemieux and this pick (being conditional at the time of the trade). The condition – Winnipeg will receive the lowest of Buffalo's first-round picks in 2015 – was converted on April 27, 2015 when the Islanders were eliminated from the 2015 Stanley Cup playoffs, ensuring that the Blues' first-round pick would be lower.
 The Winnipeg Jets' fifth-round pick went to the Carolina Hurricanes as the result of a trade on February 25, 2015 that sent Jiri Tlusty to Winnipeg in exchange for a third-round pick in 2016 and this pick (being conditional at the time of the trade). The condition – Carolina will receive a fifth-round pick in 2015 if Winnipeg qualifies for the 2015 Stanley Cup playoffs – was converted on April 9, 2015.
 The Washington Capitals' seventh-round pick went to the Winnipeg Jets as the result of a trade on June 28, 2014 that sent Edward Pasquale and a sixth-round pick in 2014 to Washington in exchange for a sixth-round pick in 2014, Nashville's seventh-round pick in 2014 and this pick.

References

Winnipeg Jets seasons
Winnipeg Jets season, 2015-16
Winni